Wolfschlugen is a town in the district of Esslingen in the Filder Plain in Baden-Württemberg in southern Germany.

History 
Wolfschlugen was first mentioned in documents on April 2, 1318 when a local named Benz from Kirchheim unter Teck sold some products of his farm in Wolfschlugen. It is however commonly assumed that people have settled there long before. A strong indication is provided by the close presence of the Waldhauser Schloss, an old Latin estate in a forest nearby Wolfschlugen.

 1380 the town became official by a declaration of Eberhard II, Count of Württemberg.
 1603 the Protestant church was reconstructed and obtained the shape which still can be seen today.
 1608/09 construction of the town hall by the builders Michel Knell and Jerg Mercklin.
 1776 construction of the first school.
 1866 foundation of the voluntary fire department.
 1899 first telegraph office.
 1903 foundation of the music society.
 1906 first telephone connection.
 1914 first electrical lights on the streets.
 1938 Wolfschlugen became a member of the district of Nürtingen.
 1970 dedication of the festival hall and the sports field.
 1973 the district of Nürtingen ceased to exist and the municipality Wolfschlugen was absorbed into the district of Esslingen.
 1993 dedication of the new sports hall.

Demographics

Number of residents 
The numbers of inhabitants are census results (¹) or official data from statistical office, Stuttgart.

References

Esslingen (district)